Lady Henrietta Augusta Lloyd-Mostyn (née Nevill; 18 June 1830 – 25 January 1912) was an English philanthropist and photographer who contributed to the development of the Welsh town of Llandudno.

Life and work
Augusta Nevill was born at Birling Manor near Maidstone, Kent. Her parents were William Nevill, 4th Earl of Abergavenny, and Caroline Leeke. Her sisters, Caroline Emily Nevill and Isabel Nevill, were also photographers.

On 19 July 1855 Augusta Nevill married Thomas Lloyd-Mostyn. They had two sons, Llewelyn Neville Vaughan Lloyd-Mostyn and Harry Richard Lloyd-Mostyn. They lived at Gloddaeth Hall.

Augusta Mostyn commissioned All Saints Church, Deganwy from the architect John Douglas as a memorial to her parents.

She commissioned the Mostyn Art Gallery in Llandudno, the precursor of the current Mostyn gallery, as a headquarters for the Gwynedd Ladies' Arts Society, a society that was set up by a 'miss Clearance Whaite' (daughter of the president of Royal Cambrian Academy of Art), Lady Mostyn donated £10.10s (which was worth ~£1500 after inflation in 2019), thus making her the founder.
This is thought to have been the first art gallery in the world dedicated to exhibiting work by women.

Group exhibitions
Exhibition of Recent Specimens of Photography, Society of Arts, London, 1852

Collections
Mostyn's work is held in the following permanent collections:
Denver Art Museum, Denver, Colorado
J. Paul Getty Museum, Los Angeles, California: 4 prints (as of 6 March 2022)
Los Angeles County Museum of Art, California: 1 print (as of 6 March 2022)
National Gallery of Canada, Ottawa, Ontario, Canada: 1 print (as of 6 March 2022)
National Science and Media Museum, Bradford, UK
Nelson-Atkins Museum of Art, Kansas City, Missouri: 1 print (as of 6 March 2022)

References

External links
 
 Portrait of Lady Augusta Mostyn at Llandudno General Hospital

20th-century British photographers
19th-century English photographers
English women photographers
People from Birling, Kent
1830 births
1912 deaths
Augusta
People from Llandudno